Blandford is a village in the upper Hunter Region of New South Wales, Australia, located on the New England Highway and Main North railway line. A now closed railway station which opened in 1872 was located there, no trace now remains. However the old station master's house is still occupied and is adjacent to the line.

Population
In the 2016 Census, there were 183 people in Blandford.  92.2% of people were born in Australia and 97.2% of people spoke only English at home.

Notable people
 Hanna Kay, artist

References

External links

Suburbs of Upper Hunter Shire
Towns in the Hunter Region
Main North railway line, New South Wales